Satinder Kaur "Sindi" Hawkins (née Ahluwalia) (September 15, 1958 – September 21, 2010) was a Canadian politician, who was the British Columbia Liberal Party MLA for Okanagan West from 1996 to 2001 and Kelowna-Mission from 2001 to 2009.

Career
Before being elected to provincial office, Hawkins was a registered nurse in general duty, intensive care, management, education and consulting. She held a post-graduate certificate in neuroscience nursing from the Montreal Neurological Hospital. She was recognized as one of the first nurses in Canada to be certified in neuroscience nursing by the Canadian Nurses Association. Hawkins then earned a law degree from the University of Calgary and set up her own company as a lawyer with an interest in medical-legal issues. 

Hawkins was first elected in 1996 and was re-elected in 2001 and 2005. She served as Minister of Health Planning and as Minister of State for Intergovernmental Relations. As Minister of Health Planning, she was responsible for a long-term strategy to train more doctors and nurses in British Columbia. As a result of this planning, B.C. has added medical school campuses at the University of Northern British Columbia in Prince George, the University of Victoria, and at UBC Okanagan in Kelowna. The B.C. Liberal government has also expanded the number of nurses being trained around the province.

Personal life
In 2004, Hawkins was diagnosed with leukemia and waged a high-profile battle with the illness. She was saved as a result of a bone marrow transplant from her sister. Hawkins campaigned for cancer research and bone marrow donation awareness. On November 17, 2008, Hawkins announced that she would not run for re-election.

She died from leukemia on September 21, 2010, a week after her 52nd birthday.

In her honour, the cancer centre in Kelowna, BC was renamed the BC Cancer Agency Sindi Ahluwalia Hawkins Centre for the Southern Interior.

References

External links
Sindi Hawkins political website

1958 births
2010 deaths
British Columbia Liberal Party MLAs
Health ministers of British Columbia
Women MLAs in British Columbia
Canadian Sikhs
People from Kelowna
People from New Delhi
Deaths from cancer in Alberta
Deaths from leukemia
21st-century Canadian politicians
21st-century Canadian women politicians
Members of the Executive Council of British Columbia
Women government ministers of Canada
Canadian politicians of Indian descent